Ceratrichia flava, commonly known as the yellow forest sylph, is a species of butterfly in the family Hesperiidae. It is found in Nigeria, Cameroon, Equatorial Guinea, Gabon, the Republic of the Congo and the Central African Republic. The habitat consists of open areas in forests.

Adults are attracted to flowers, including the ones of Costus species.

Subspecies
Ceratrichia flava flava (Nigeria: Cross River loop, Cameroon, Equatorial Guinea, Gabon, Congo, Central African Republic)
Ceratrichia flava fernanda Evans, 1937 (Equatorial Guinea: Bioko)

References

Butterflies described in 1878
Hesperiinae
Butterflies of Africa
Taxa named by William Chapman Hewitson